This is a list of awards won by American actress and singer Idina Menzel.

Theatre Awards

Obie Awards
Menzel won an Obie Award for Special Citations for her part in the 1995 off-Broadway production of Rent.

Broadway.com Audience Awards
In 2004, Menzel won three Broadway.com Audience Awards for her role in Wicked; one for Favorite Actress in a Musical, one for Favorite Diva Performance, and one for Best Onstage Pair, which she won with co-star Kristin Chenoweth. In 2014, she won two more, for If/Then; Favorite Leading Actress in a Musical, and Favorite Onstage Pair, which she won with James Snyder. She was also nominated for Favorite Diva Performance, but lost to Neil Patrick Harris for Hedwig and the Angry Inch.

Drama Desk Awards
In 2000, Menzel was nominated for the Drama Desk Award for Outstanding Featured Actress in a Musical for her role of Kate in the off-Broadway show The Wild Party. She then was nominated for the Drama Desk Award for Outstanding Actress in a Musical in 2004 for her role in Wicked, and was nominated again in 2005 for her roles of Kesa, Lily, and Deanna in the off-Broadway musical See What I Wanna See, and in 2014 for her role in If/Then.

Drama League Awards
Menzel was first nominated for the Drama League Award for Distinguished Performance in 2004 for her role in Wicked. She was nominated again in 2005 for See What I Wanna See and in 2014 for If/Then. Menzel received the 2018 Musical Achievement Award.

Tony Awards
In 1996, Menzel was nominated for the Tony Award for Best Featured Actress in a Musical for her role as Maureen Johnson in the Rent. In 2004, she won the Tony Award for Best Actress in a Musical for her role as Elphaba in Wicked. She was nominated again in 2014 for her performance as Elizabeth Vaughan in the musical If/Then.

Film and Television Awards

Teen Choice Awards
She was nominated in 2010 for Choice Music: Group for Glee and in 2014 for Choice Music: Single for Let it Go. She also won one for Choice Animated Movie: Voice for Frozen.

Satellite Award
In 2014, she was nominated for Best Original Song for Let it Go.

Behind the Voice Actors Awards
Menzel won Best Female Vocal Performance in a Lead Role and Breakthrough Voice Actress of the Year for Frozen in 2014.

Music Awards

American Music Awards
She won the American Music Award for Top Soundtrack for the Frozen soundtrack in 2014.

Billboard Music Awards
Menzel won the 2014 Billboard Breakthrough Artist Award. She was nominated for a Top Streaming Award in 2015 for Let it Go, and won a Top Soundtrack Award for the soundtrack to Frozen.\

Other Awards

Critics Awards
Menzel was nominated for the Outer Critics Circle Award for Best Actress in a Musical in 2004 for her part in Wicked. She was nominated for a Washington D.C. Film Critics Association Award for Best Ensemble for the film version of Rent in 2005, as well as two Broadcast Film Critics Association Awards for Best Ensemble and Best Song Performance, two Northeastern Critics Award for Best Ensemble and Best Supporting Actress, and an Online Film & Television Association Award for Best Adapted Song. She was nominated for another one for Best Guest Actress in a Comedy Series for her role on Glee in 2010, and for Best Voice Over Performance for Frozen in 2014, for which she won a Best Original Song one for singing Let it Go. For that role, she was also nominated for an Alliance of Women Film Journalists Award for Best Animated Female, a St. Louis Film Critics Association Award for Special Merit, and a world soundtrack award for Best Song Written for Film.

Other Choice Awards
She won the Whatsonstage.com Award for Best Actress in a Musical in 2006 for Wicked in the West End. In 2010, she won Gay People's Choice Awards for Best Ensemble and Best Music Duo or Group for Glee. She was  also nominated for a Lesbian/Bi People's Choice Award for Best Music Duo or Group.

References

Lists of awards received by American actor
Lists of awards received by American musician